The Henry N. Fisher House is a historic house at 120 Crescent Street in Waltham, Massachusetts.  It is a -story wood-frame structure, with the asymmetrical massing typical of Queen Anne houses.  It has a wraparound porch with turned posts, lattice railing, and a sunburst motif in the gabled pediment above the steps.  The interior has well-preserved woodwork and marble fireplaces.  The house was built c. 1881–86, and is a well-preserved Queen Anne Victorian on the city's south side.  It was home for many years to Henry N. Fisher, who served as city mayor in the late 1880s, and was a foreman at the Waltham Watch Company.

The house was listed on the National Register of Historic Places in 1989.

See also
National Register of Historic Places listings in Waltham, Massachusetts

References

Houses in Waltham, Massachusetts
Houses on the National Register of Historic Places in Waltham, Massachusetts
Queen Anne architecture in Massachusetts
Houses completed in 1881
1881 establishments in Massachusetts